Wu Dajing (born 24 July 1994) is a Chinese short track speed skater. He is a gold medalist in the Men's 500 metres at the 2018 Winter Olympic Games in Pyeongchang. He won a gold medal in the Men's 500m at the 2014 ISU World Championships in Montreal, Canada.

He won China's only gold medal at the 2018 Winter Olympic Games in Pyeongchang. He won the Men's 500 metres, setting an Olympic record (heat) and two world records (quarterfinal and final) while leading wire-to-wire in all three contests en route to capturing the gold. He became only the second person in history to have skated the discipline in under 40 seconds, after American J. R. Celski who managed the feat in 2012 in Calgary at a much higher elevation where the reduced air density tends to give the skater an advantage due to lowered air resistance. Wu also won a silver medal with his teammates in the men's 5000m team relay.

Wu Dajing was China's flag bearer during the parade of nations at the opening ceremony of the 2017 Asian Winter Games.

Wu Dajing also made a special appearance in the Chinese drama TV series Skate into Love in 2020.

International competition podiums

References

External links

Wu Dajing's profile, from http://www.sochi2014.com; retrieved 2014-02-14.

1994 births
Living people
Chinese male short track speed skaters
Olympic short track speed skaters of China
Olympic medalists in short track speed skating
Olympic gold medalists for China
Olympic silver medalists for China
Olympic bronze medalists for China
Short track speed skaters at the 2014 Winter Olympics
Short track speed skaters at the 2018 Winter Olympics
Short track speed skaters at the 2022 Winter Olympics
Medalists at the 2014 Winter Olympics
Medalists at the 2018 Winter Olympics
Medalists at the 2022 Winter Olympics
Asian Games medalists in short track speed skating
Asian Games gold medalists for China
Asian Games silver medalists for China
Short track speed skaters at the 2017 Asian Winter Games
Medalists at the 2017 Asian Winter Games
World Short Track Speed Skating Championships medalists
Sportspeople from Heilongjiang
People from Jiamusi
21st-century Chinese people